The Apertura 2016 Copa MX Final was the final of the Apertura 2016 Copa MX, the ninth edition of the Copa MX under its current format and 76th overall organized by the Mexican Football Federation, the governing body of association football in Mexico.

The final was contested in a single leg format between Liga MX clubs Querétaro and Guadalajara. The match was hosted by Querétaro at Estadio Corregidora in Querétaro, Querétaro. As winners, Querétaro earned a spot to face the winners of the Clausura 2017 edition in the 2017 Supercopa MX.

Qualified teams

Venue
Due to the tournament's regulations the higher seed among both finalists during the group stage will host the final, thus Estadio Corregidora hosted the final. Opened on 5 February 1985 with a match between the national teams of Mexico and Poland, the venue has been home to various football franchises based in Querétaro. This is the second time in less than two years, the venue has hosted a final of any kind, the previous was the Liga MX Clausura 2015 final between Querétaro and Santos Laguna where Querétaro lost 5–3 on aggregate. The venue also hosted four games of the 1986 FIFA World Cup and nine of the 2011 FIFA U-17 World Cup.

Background
Querétaro previously never won the tournament. Before reaching this final, the last time Querétaro reached a final of any kind was the Liga MX Clausura 2015 final where they lost to Santos Laguna 5–3 on aggregate. Guadalajara last reached a final the previous year when they defeated León in the Apertura 2015 Copa MX Final.

Querétaro won two, drew one, lost one and scored six goals during group stage, as they were seeded second. They eliminated BUAP in the Round of 16, Cruz Azul in the quarterfinals, and Toluca in the semifinals on penalty kicks.

Guadalajara won one, drew two, lost one and scored four goals during group stage, as they were seeded second. They eliminated Morelia in the Round of 16, Oaxaca in the quarterfinals and their arch-rivals, América, in the semifinals on penalty kicks.

Road to the finals
Note: In all results below, the score of the finalist is given first.

Match

Broadcasters

References

Copa MX Finals
2016–17 in Mexican football
2016 in Mexican sports
Copa MX Final 2016 Final Apertura